Sullivan Gardens is an unincorporated community in southwestern Sullivan County, Tennessee, located southwest of Kingsport.  Since the 1990s, Sullivan Gardens has experienced a decline, due mainly to the construction of the Sullivan Gardens Parkway, which re-routed Highway 93, and resulted in traffic being routed around, rather than through, the town, leading to the eventual closure of a number of small businesses.  Prior to the late 1990s, there were a number of small, locally owned stores and businesses along the old Highway 93 in the town of Sullivan Gardens, including gas stations, a plant nursery, pharmacy, and hardware store.  All of these businesses are now closed and many of the buildings that housed them have been demolished or abandoned.

Education
Sullivan Elementary School and Sullivan Middle School are located in the "downtown" area.

Transportation
Tennessee State Route 93 (Sullivan Gardens Parkway) runs north and south through the community and Tennessee State Route 347 (Lone Star Road) runs east and west.

References

Unincorporated communities in Sullivan County, Tennessee
Unincorporated communities in Tennessee